Daiyuzenji is a Rinzai Zen Buddhist temple located on the north side of Chicago, Illinois, in the United States.

Daiyuzenji began in 1982 as the Illinois betsuin (branch temple) of Daihonzan Chozen-ji, a Rinzai headquarters temple founded in 1979 in Honolulu, Hawaii by Omori Sogen Roshi (1904-1994), a successor in the Tenryu-ji line of Rinzai Zen.  Fumio Toyoda, a lay Zen master and martial art teacher who had emigrated to Chicago from Japan in 1974, was the driving force behind the founding and administration of the betsuin.  Tenshin Tanouye Roshi and Dogen Hosokawa Roshi, two of Omori Roshi's successors who taught at Chozen-ji, traveled to Chicago beginning in the early 1980s to lead sesshin there.

Eventually the Chicago betsuin developed a cadre of senior students, including several ordained priests.  In 2005 it was designated a fully independent temple by Hosokawa Roshi, named Sokeizan Daiyuzenji (曹渓山大雄禅寺).  So'zan Miller Roshi, one of Hosokawa Roshi's dharma heirs, was appointed the first Daiyuzenji shike (abbot).

Daiyuzenji teachers are also involved with the establishment of Korinji, a new Rinzai Zen Buddhist sodo (monastery) in the Madison, Wisconsin area.  Groundbreaking for this occurred in June, 2009.  Daiyuzenji and Korinji together anchor a network of associated Zen practice groups called the Rinzai Zen Community (RZC).

Activities
 Zazen (meditation) and okyo (chanting)
 Koan training
 Short and long sesshin
 Monthly mini-retreats (zazenkai)
 Buddhist studies group
 Weekly introductions to Zen practice for beginners
 Related cultural and fine arts

See also
Zen
Rinzai school
Buddhism in the United States
Timeline of Zen Buddhism in the United States
 For an explanation of terms concerning Japanese Buddhism, Japanese Buddhist art, and Japanese Buddhist temple architecture, see the Glossary of Japanese Buddhism.

External links
 Daiyuzenji Temple
 The Rinzai Zen Community
 Korinji Monastery

Buddhism in Illinois
Zen centers in the United States
Buddhist temples in Illinois
Religious buildings and structures in Chicago